Morne Diablotin National Park is a national park in the northern mountain ranges of Dominica, an island nation in the Caribbean.  The park comprises , amounting to 4.4% of the nation's area.  It was established in January 2000, primarily to protect the habitat of the endangered sisserou parrot, an endemic bird species that is a national symbol of Dominica.

The park is home to 1,447-meter high Morne Diablotin, the tallest mountain on the island and the second highest mountain in the Lesser Antilles.

During the 18th century, the land was home to at least six different encampments of escaped slaves. Dr. John Imray, a Scottish physician, completed the first recorded scaling of Morne Diablotin in 1867. Today, the park is home to 18 different avian species.

References

National parks of Dominica
Protected areas established in 2000
2000 establishments in North America